Robot Visions (1990) is a collection of science fiction short stories and factual essays by Isaac Asimov. Many of the stories are reprinted from other Asimov collections, particularly I, Robot and The Bicentennial Man and Other Stories. It also includes the title story, "Robot Visions" (written specifically for this collection), which combines Asimov's motifs of robots and of time travel. It is the companion book to Robot Dreams (1986).

Contents

Introduction: The Robot Chronicles
An 18-page introductory essay by Asimov, consisting of 17 pages of text and a one-page illustration by Ralph McQuarrie (these are the page counts of the hardcover edition).  This essay (minus the illustration) was later reprinted in Asimov's collection Gold.

Stories

Essays

References

External links

Science fiction short story collections by Isaac Asimov
Essay collections by Isaac Asimov
1990 short story collections
Roc Books books